Aborrebjerg is a hill on the Danish island of  Møn.

Geography 

Aborrebjerg is mainly covered by wood and shrubs like junipers; behind it some ponds are located. The summit is marked with a circular stone.

Geology 

As well as the neighbouring cliffs Aborrebjerg bedrock is chalk, which originated during the Cretaceous and was later lifted to its present location by tectonic movements following the ice ages.

Access to the summit 
The can be easily reached through a waymarked foothpath. From the summit there is a good view. With good weather looking west both Farøbroerne and Queen Alexandrine Bridge can be seen, while looking north one can see up to Stevns.

See also
 Møllehøj
 List of hills and mountains in Denmark

References

External links
  Hiking guide:  

Hills of Denmark
Møn